David Boyd Burritt (born c. 1955) is an American businessman. He is the chief executive officer of U.S. Steel since May 2017.

Early life
Burritt was born in St. Louis, Missouri. He earned a bachelor's degree in accounting in 1977 from Bradley University in Peoria and a master's degree in business administration from the University of Illinois at Urbana–Champaign in 1990.

Career
Burritt worked for Caterpillar for 32 years, before joining U.S. Steel in 2013 as CFO.

In February 2017, he became president and chief operating officer. In May 2017, it was announced that Burritt would succeed Mario Longhi as CEO. In March 2018, Burritt announced he would re-open the U.S. Steel plant in Granite City, Illinois thanks to President Donald J. Trump's tariffs. On July 26, 2018, Burritt introduced the president, who gave a speech at the factory.

Personal life
Burritt has a wife, Lynn.

References

Living people
People from Morton, Illinois
Bradley University alumni
Gies College of Business alumni
Businesspeople from Illinois
American chief executives of manufacturing companies
U.S. Steel people
American chief operating officers
American chief financial officers
Caterpillar Inc. people
1955 births